The 1996 NCAA Division I-A football season ended with the Florida Gators being crowned National Champions after defeating rival Florida State in the Sugar Bowl, which was the season's designated Bowl Alliance national championship game. Florida had faced Florida State earlier in the year, when they were ranked No. 1 and No. 2, and lost 24–21. However, unranked Texas's upset of No. 3 Nebraska in the first ever Big 12 Championship Game set up the rematch of in-state rivals in New Orleans. In the Sugar Bowl, Florida's Heisman Trophy-winning senior quarterback Danny Wuerffel and head coach Steve Spurrier led the Gators to a 52–20 victory and their first national championship.

Because the Pac-10 and Big Ten Conferences were not yet part of the Bowl Alliance, their champions met in the Rose Bowl as they had for decades. In 1996, these conference champions were potential national title contenders in No. 2 Arizona State and No. 4 Ohio State. In a close Rose Bowl contest, Arizona State's Jake Plummer ran for a touchdown with 1:40 left to play to give his team the lead, but Ohio State responded with its own touchdown drive led by backup quarterback Joe Germaine and won 20–17. Ohio State finished No. 2 in the final AP poll behind No. 1 Florida, and Arizona State finished No. 4 behind Florida State. The poll results helped push the Pac-10 and Big Ten to give up their Rose Bowl tradition. Before the 1998 season, they both agreed to join an expanded Bowl Championship Series (BCS) agreement, giving their programs a chance to play in a national championship game. Another controversy that led to the creation of the BCS was that No. 5 BYU was not invited to a major bowl game but were snubbed in favor of lower ranked teams from Bowl Alliance conferences.

The 1996 season saw ongoing realignment of many conferences. One of the most notable developments was the creation of the Big 12 Conference, which consisted of programs from the old Big 8 along with four former members of the dissolved Southwest Conference, namely Texas, Texas A&M, Texas Tech, and Baylor. The Big 12 began play as a two division conference, with Oklahoma and Oklahoma State joining the South Division, breaking up the classic Nebraska–Oklahoma rivalry, but renewing the Texas-Oklahoma rivalry, known as the Red River Shootout.  The first Big 12 football game featured Texas Tech and Kansas State.  Kansas State won by a score of 21–14.

The 1996 season was also notable as it marked the end of ties in college football, as an overtime system was put into place across all of Division I. Though it has been modified slightly, the "Kansas Playoff" overtime rules have been used ever since. (The 1995 season also had overtime rules, but only for postseason games, and they were not used since none of the affected games ended regulation play in a tie.)

Rule changes
 The overtime system adopted in the 1995 season for bowl games was expanded for all Division I-A games.
 On punts and field goal attempts, the defense cannot touch the center/long snapper for one second after the snap.  Violators are penalized 15 yards and an automatic first down.
 Officials were instructed to more strictly enforce intentional grounding rules.

Conference realignment
Four teams upgraded from Division I-AA prior to the season and one university dropped its football program. As such, the total number of Division I-A schools increased to 111.
The Big 12 Conference began play this season after a merger between the Big 8 Conference and four members of the former Southwest Conference (Texas, Texas A&M, Texas Tech, and Baylor). The new 12-member conference was divided into two, six-team divisions.
Conference USA was formed prior to the season after a merger between two conferences that had previously not sponsored football, the Metro Conference and the Great Midwest Conference. Members of the new league included SWC member Houston (from the former Southwest Conference) and five long-time independents: Cincinnati, Louisville, Memphis, Southern Miss, and Tulane.
C-USA was given a tie-in with the Liberty Bowl for its league champion.
The Western Athletic Conference, in turn, accepted TCU, SMU, and Rice from the SWC, UNLV and San Jose State from the Big West, and independent Tulsa. These moves pushed the WAC's membership to 16 and resulted in the creation of two divisions (Pacific and Mountain) and a league championship game.
The Big West Conference also saw Arkansas State, Louisiana Tech, Northern Illinois, and Southwestern Louisiana (now Louisiana–Lafayette) depart to become independents. All four teams had joined the Big West in  football only in 1993, remaining in more geographically-appropriate conferences for other sports.
Pacific dropped their football team after the 1995 season. The Tigers had been a member of the Big West.
Four teams upgraded from Division I-AA prior to the season: Alabama–Birmingham (UAB), Boise State, Central Florida, and Idaho.
Boise State, Idaho, and previously independent North Texas joined the Big West, while UAB and UCF became Division I-A independents.

Conference changes

Regular Season

August-September
Two-time defending champion Nebraska was heavily favored to win a third straight national title, and the Cornhuskers were followed in the preseason AP Poll by No. 2 Tennessee, No. 3 Florida State, No. 4 Florida, and No. 5 Colorado.

August 31: No. 1 Nebraska and No. 3 Florida State had not begun their schedules. No. 2 Tennessee overwhelmed UNLV 62-3, No. 4 Florida defeated Southwestern Louisiana 55-21, and No. 5 Colorado beat Washington State 37-19. The top five remained the same in the next poll.

September 7: No. 1 Nebraska opened with a 55-14 win over Michigan State, No. 2 Tennessee beat UCLA 35-20, No. 3 Florida State defeated Duke 44-7, No. 4 Florida prevailed 62-14 over Georgia Southern, and No. 5 Colorado won 48-34 at Colorado State. The top five again remained the same.

September 14: The only top-five team active this weekend was No. 5 Colorado, who committed 14 penalties (one of which nullified a game-tying touchdown) in a 20-13 loss to No. 11 Michigan. No. 6 Penn State shut out Northern Illinois 49-0 and moved up in the next poll: No. 1 Nebraska, No. 2 Tennessee, No. 3 Florida State, No. 4 Florida, and No. 5 Penn State.

September 19-21: No. 1 Nebraska took a 26-game winning streak into their matchup with No. 17 Arizona State, a team they had defeated by 49 points the previous year. However, the Sun Devils completely neutralized the Cornhuskers’ offense in a 19-0 shutout win, Nebraska’s first loss since the 1993 national title game. In a matchup of SEC contenders, No. 4 Florida took a 35-0 second-quarter lead over No. 2 Tennessee and held off a Volunteers comeback for a 35-29 victory. No. 3 Florida State won 51-17 at North Carolina State, No. 5 Penn State shut out Temple 41-0, No. 7 Ohio State blanked Pittsburgh 72-0, and No. 9 Notre Dame beat No. 6 Texas 27-24 on a field goal as time expired. The next poll featured No. 1 Florida, No. 2 Florida State, No. 3 Penn State, No. 4 Ohio State, and No. 5 Notre Dame.

September 28: No. 1 Florida dominated Kentucky 65-0, and No. 2 Florida State shut out No. 11 North Carolina 13-0. No. 3 Penn State earned a 23-20 win at Wisconsin, but No. 4 Ohio State was more impressive in a 29-16 victory at No. 5 Notre Dame. No. 6 Arizona State beat Oregon 48-27 to move into the top five: No. 1 Florida, No. 2 Florida State, No. 3 Ohio State, No. 4 Penn State, and No. 5 Arizona State.

October
October 5: No. 1 Florida won 42-7 at Arkansas, and No. 2 Florida State defeated Clemson 34-3. In their second top-five matchup in two weeks, No. 3 Ohio State looked dominant in a 38-7 rout of No. 4 Penn State. No. 5 Arizona State beat Boise State 56-7, and No. 7 Nebraska overwhelmed No. 16 Kansas State 39-3 to move back into the top five: No. 1 Florida, No. 2 Ohio State, No. 3 Florida State, No. 4 Arizona State, and No. 5 Nebraska.

October 12: No. 1 Florida defeated No. 12 LSU 56-13. After two straight wins over highly-ranked opponents, No. 2 Ohio State needed a fourth-quarter comeback to escape unranked Wisconsin 17-14. No. 3 Florida State visited No. 6 Miami and beat their rivals 34-16. No. 4 Arizona State came back from a 21-point deficit to win 42-34 at UCLA. No. 5 Nebraska shut out Baylor 49-0, and the top five remained the same in the next poll.

October 19: No. 1 Florida dominated another ranked SEC opponent, winning 51-10 over No. 16 Auburn. No. 2 Ohio State won 42-14 at Purdue. No. 3 Florida State was idle. No. 4 Arizona State fell behind again and again in their game against USC but made three game-tying drives in regulation and another one in overtime. After taking their first lead of the game in double overtime, the Sun Devils put the game away with an 85-yard fumble return for a 48-35 final score. No. 5 Nebraska defeated Texas Tech 24-10, and the top five again remained the same.

October 26: No. 1 Florida was idle. No. 2 Ohio State visited No. 20 Iowa for a 38-26 win. No. 3 Florida State faced No. 14 Virginia, who had defeated them in a major upset the previous year, and the Seminoles got their revenge with a 31-24 victory. No. 4 Arizona State won 41-9 at Stanford, and No. 5 Nebraska beat Kansas 63-7. The top five again remained the same.

November-December
November 2: No. 1 Florida defeated Georgia 47-7, No. 2 Ohio State blanked Minnesota 45-0, No. 3 Florida State won 49-3 at Georgia Tech, No. 4 Arizona State visited Oregon State for a 29-14 victory, and No. 5 Nebraska blasted Oklahoma 73-21. The top five were the same yet again.

November 9: With all of the top-ranking teams on long winning streaks, several conference races were effectively over by early November. No. 1 Florida had an unexpectedly hard time with last-place Vanderbilt, but held on for a 28-21 win which clinched the SEC Eastern Division title for the Gators. No. 2 Ohio State posted their second straight shutout, 48-0 at Illinois. No. 3 Florida State wrapped up the ACC title with a 44-7 victory at Wake Forest, while No. 4 Arizona State earned the Pac-10 crown with a 35-7 defeat of California. No. 5 Nebraska beat Missouri 51-7, and the top five continued to stay the same.

November 16: No. 1 Florida defeated South Carolina 52-25, No. 2 Ohio State clinched the Big Ten title with a 27-17 win at Indiana, and No. 3 Florida State beat No. 25 Southern Mississippi 54-14. No. 4 Arizona State was idle, while No. 5 Nebraska won 49-14 at Iowa State. The top five remained unchanged for the fifth consecutive week.

November 23: No. 1 Florida and No. 3 Florida State were idle as they prepared for their upcoming game against each other. For the third time in four years, No. 2 Ohio State was undefeated going into their season-ending contest with archrival Michigan. In both 1993 and 1995, the Wolverines had spoiled the Buckeyes’ perfect record—and the result was the same in 1996, as No. 21 Michigan held OSU without a touchdown in a 13-9 come-from-behind victory which dropped Ohio State coach John Cooper’s career record against Michigan to 1-7-1. No. 4 Arizona State, soon to be the Buckeyes’ opponent in the Rose Bowl, did manage to complete a perfect regular season with a 56-14 win at Arizona. No. 5 Nebraska and No. 6 Colorado, who would play each other the following week, were both idle. The next poll featured No. 1 Florida, No. 2 Florida State, No. 3 Arizona State, No. 4 Nebraska, and No. 5 Colorado.

November 29-30: No. 1 Florida and No. 2 Florida State, both undefeated, met with a spot in the national title game seemingly on the line. The Seminoles jumped out to a 17-0 lead in the first quarter and held off a late Gators comeback to earn a 24-21 victory. No. 3 Arizona State, the only other undefeated team, had finished their schedule. No. 4 Nebraska and No. 5 Colorado, both with one loss, faced each other for the championship of the new Big 12 Northern Division, and the Cornhuskers prevailed 17-12 on a rain-soaked field. The next poll featured No. 1 Florida State, No. 2 Arizona State, No. 3 Nebraska, No. 4 Florida, and No. 5 Ohio State.

No. 1 Florida State and No. 2 Arizona State, the only two undefeated teams at the end of the regular season, could not play each other for the national title; as the winner of the Pac-10, Arizona State was contractually obligated to meet Big Ten champ Ohio State in the Rose Bowl. In previous years, No. 3 Nebraska would have been the next team in line to face Florida State. However, due to the recent merger between the Big 8 and SWC, the Cornhuskers needed to play one more game before heading into the bowls. In the first-ever Big 12 Championship Game on December 7, Nebraska faced off against Texas. The unranked Longhorns trailed in the fourth quarter, but scored two late touchdowns to pull off a 37-27 upset. Later that day, No. 4 Florida beat No. 11 Alabama 45-30 in the SEC Championship Game to move back ahead of Nebraska in the final pre-bowl poll. No. 6 Brigham Young, with a 28-25 overtime defeat of No. 20 Wyoming in the WAC Championship Game, also moved up: No. 1 Florida State, No. 2 Arizona State, No. 3 Florida, No. 4 Ohio State, and No. 5 Brigham Young.

Therefore, just a month after their previous meeting, Florida State and Florida were set for a rematch in the Sugar Bowl. The Rose Bowl between Arizona State and Ohio State would also have national title implications, especially if the Seminoles lost and the Sun Devils won. The major games were rounded out by No. 5 Brigham Young and No. 14 Kansas State in the Cotton Bowl, No. 6 Nebraska and No. 10 Virginia Tech in the Orange, and No. 7 Penn State and No. 20 Texas in the Fiesta.

Conference standings

Bowl Alliance first and seconds
The Bowl Alliance did not include the Pacific-10 and Big 10 conferences, whose champions played in the Rose Bowl.  Thus, Arizona State and Ohio State (who met in the Rose Bowl) were excluded from the Bowl Alliance championship.

Bowl games

Final AP Poll

Florida
Ohio St.
Florida St.
Arizona St.
BYU
Nebraska
Penn St.
Colorado
Tennessee
North Carolina
Alabama
LSU
Virginia Tech
Miami (FL)
Northwestern
Washington
Kansas St.
Iowa
Notre Dame
Michigan
Syracuse
Wyoming
Texas
Auburn
Army

Others receiving votes: 26. West Virginia; 27. East Carolina; 28. Southern Mississippi; 29. Stanford; 30. Wisconsin; 31. San Diego St.; 32. Virginia; 33. Clemson

Final Coaches Poll

Florida
Ohio St.
Florida St.
Arizona St.
Brigham Young
Nebraska
Penn St.
Colorado
Tennessee
North Carolina
Alabama
Virginia Tech
LSU
Miami (FL)
Washington
Northwestern
Kansas St.
Iowa
Syracuse
Michigan
Notre Dame
Wyoming
Texas
Army
Auburn

Heisman Trophy voting
The Heisman Memorial Trophy Award is given to the Most Outstanding Player of the year
Winner:
Danny Wuerffel, Florida, Quarterback (1363 points)
2. Troy Davis, Iowa St., RB (1174 points)
3. Jake Plummer, Arizona St., QB (685 points)
4. Orlando Pace, Ohio St., OT (599 points)
5. Warrick Dunn, Florida St., RB (341 points)

Other major awards
Maxwell Award (College Player of the Year) - Danny Wuerffel, Florida
Walter Camp Award (Player of the Year) - Danny Wuerffel, Florida
Davey O'Brien Award (Quarterback) - Danny Wuerffel, Florida
Johnny Unitas Golden Arm Award (Senior Quarterback) - Danny Wuerffel, Florida
Doak Walker Award (Running Back) - Byron Hanspard, Texas Tech
Fred Biletnikoff Award (Wide Receiver) - Marcus Harris, Wyoming
Bronko Nagurski Trophy (Defensive Player) - Pat Fitzgerald, Northwestern
Dick Butkus Award (Linebacker) - Matt Russell, Colorado
Lombardi Award (Lineman or Linebacker) - Orlando Pace, Ohio State
Outland Trophy (Interior Lineman) - Orlando Pace, OT, Ohio State
Jim Thorpe Award (Defensive Back) - Lawrence Wright, Florida
Lou Groza Award (Placekicker) - Tony DeGiovanni, University of Miami
Paul "Bear" Bryant Award - Bruce Snyder, Arizona St.

References